Aneuclis is a genus of the parasitic wasp family Ichneumonidae.

Species

 Aneuclis aciculifera Khalaim, 2004
 Aneuclis anterior Horstmann, 1971
 Aneuclis atra Khalaim, 2004
 Aneuclis brevicauda (Thomson, 1889)
 Aneuclis denticauda (Khalaim, 2005)
 Aneuclis horstmanni Khalaim, 2004
 Aneuclis incidens (Thomson, 1889)
 Aneuclis interstitialis Horstmann, 2012
 Aneuclis laminosa Khalaim, 2009
 Aneuclis lanternaria Khalaim, 2009
 Aneuclis larga Khalaim, 2009
 Aneuclis lasciva Khalaim, 2009
 Aneuclis lugubris Khalaim, 2009
 Aneuclis luteola Khalaim, 2004
 Aneuclis maritima (Thomson, 1889)
 Aneuclis melanaria (Holmgren, 1860)
 Aneuclis minutissima (Khalaim, 2005)
 Aneuclis mongolica Khalaim, 2004
 Aneuclis obscura Horstmann, 2012
 Aneuclis petiolaris Horstmann, 2012
 Aneuclis rhodesiana Khalaim, 2010
 Aneuclis rufipleuris Horstmann, 1980
 Aneuclis rufula Horstmann, 2012
 Aneuclis semeonovnae Khalaim, 2004
 Aneuclis stepposa Khalaim, 2004
 Aneuclis stigmata Khalaim, 2004
 Aneuclis tarbagataica Khalaim, 2004
 Aneuclis unica Khalaim, 2004
 Aneuclis vannoorti Khalaim, 2009

References

External links
Species List

Ichneumonidae genera